ITMS may refer to:

 International Thomas Merton Society
 Indian Trails Middle School, a school in Winter Springs, Florida
 Ion trap mobility spectrometry, an instrumental method for chemical detection and analysis
 iTunes Music Store, the former name of the iTunes Store